Dhoop Mein Sawan is a Pakistani drama mini-series produced and directed by Mehreen Jabbar. It starred Nadia Jamil, Humayun Saeed, Huma Nawab and Yasir Nawaz in lead roles. It broadcast on Pakistan Television Corporation in 1998.

Plot 
The families of Saba and Asim are very happy as their marriage has been fixed. However, Saba is not willing to marry him as she is a workaholic and a practical woman, but Asim has a dominating and rigid personality. She agrees to it only because of everyone's happiness. Whenever she meets him, they end up on some conflict.

Asim works in his father's production company where Batool who works in video editing department is the only friend of him. She loves her but he has not such intentions towards her. When Batool learns of his engagement she tries unfair means to get him. She goes to a peerni to break his relation.

To attend Asim's wedding, his elder brother Taimoor returns from abroad. Before engagement, Saba's father asks her for her willingness to which she replies affirmatively. After engagement, on the advice of her sister Sara, Saba calls Asim and tells him clearly that she is not willing to continue their relation because they have no compatibility. The heartbroken Asim then calls Batool and asks for some leisure time to lighten himself but she refuses. He then suicides by overdosing the sleeping pills.

After Asim's demise, Maryam blames Saba and breaks all of her connections with the family, when Batool tells her that Saba is responsible for his death as she has broke the engagement. Taimoor however, doesn't think the same as her mother and tries to comfort her often. Consequently, they become colse, fall for each other and decides to marry.

When Maryam learns of it, she not only refuses to approve it but also pressures Saba to refuse Taimoor for it. Saba's mother however supports her this time.

Batool first tries to keep Saba and Taimoor away from each other but then realizes that she did wrong with Saba due to her selfish love for Asim. She confesses her past mistakes in front of Maryam and tells her about Saba upon which she goes to Mehmood's house along with Taimoor to end her resentment.

Cast 
 Nadia Jamil as Saba
 Yasir Nawaz as Asim
 Huma Nawab as Batool
 Humayun Saeed as Taimoor
 Sajida Syed as Mehmooda
 Akbar Subhani as Ahmed
 Samina Ahmad as Maryam
 Salma Hassan as Sara
 Affan Qureshi as Zain
 Shakeel
 Ubaida Ansari as Rani
 Mumtaz Kanwal

References 

1990s Pakistani television series
Pakistan Television Corporation original programming
Urdu-language television shows
Pakistani drama television series